August Rudolf Lindt (5 August 1905 – 14 April 2000), also known as Auguste R. Lindt, was a Swiss lawyer and diplomat. He served as Chairman of UNICEF from 1953 to 1954 and as United Nations High Commissioner for Refugees from 1956 to 1960.

Career

Lindt was the son of August Ludwig Lindt, a pharmacist and chocolate manufacturer, and  Lina Rufenacht. He studied law in Geneva and Bern. He is related to Rodolphe Lindt of Lindt & Sprüngli. He earned a doctoral degree in 1927 with a dissertation on Soviet commercial law, and worked in banking in Paris, Berlin and London from 1929 to 1940. From 1941 to 1945 he worked for Swiss military intelligence. In 1945 he became involved in humanitarian work in Berlin on behalf of the International Committee of the Red Cross, and in 1946 he joined the Swiss Federal Department of Foreign Affairs as a press spokesman. He was later posted to the embassy in London.

From 1953 to 1956, he was the Swiss Permanent Observer to the United Nations in New York. He was Chairman of UNICEF from 1953 to 1954. In 1956 he was appointed as the United Nations High Commissioner for Refugees, the second person to hold the office after Gerrit Jan van Heuven Goedhart, and served until 1960.

He served as the Ambassador of Switzerland to the United States from 1960 to 1962 in Washington, where he met Karl Barth. He was Ambassador to the Soviet Union from 1966 to 1968. He was later General Commissioner of the International Committee of the Red Cross for West Africa and Swiss Ambassador to Mongolia, India and Nepal. He was an adviser to the President of Rwanda from 1973 to 1975.

In 1962, he married Romanian Ileana Maria Pociovălişteanu Bulova in Arlington.

References

Literature
Rolf Wilhelm (ed.): August R. Lindt: Patriot und Weltbürger. Haupt Verlag, Bern 2003, .

Chairmen and Presidents of UNICEF
United Nations High Commissioners for Refugees
People from Bern
1905 births
2000 deaths
Permanent Representatives of Switzerland to the United Nations
Ambassadors of Switzerland to the United States
Ambassadors of Switzerland to the Soviet Union
Ambassadors of Switzerland to Mongolia
Ambassadors of Switzerland to India
Ambassadors of Switzerland to Nepal
Swiss officials of the United Nations
University of Bern alumni